Jim King was an American football coach and player. He served as the head football coach at Livingston University (now the University of West Alabama) between 1973 and 1976.

Career
King was a member of the Southern Miss Golden Eagles football team from 1963 through 1964 where he played the lineman position. Following his graduation, he served as an offensive line coach at Livingston from 1970 through to 1972. In 1973, he was promoted to head football coach at Livingston and compiled an overall record of 29 wins, 14 two losses and one tie during his four-year tenure there (29–14–1). After his Livingston tenure, King served as an offensive line coach at Auburn, Florida and Wyoming.

Head coaching record

References

Year of birth missing (living people)
Living people
Auburn Tigers football coaches
Florida Gators football coaches
Southern Miss Golden Eagles football players
West Alabama Tigers football coaches
Wyoming Cowboys football coaches
People from Adamsville, Alabama